Andras Vleminckx is a Belgian music producer, songwriter and audio engineer. He has produced songs for artists like Kat Deluna("Drop it Low", "Dancing Tonight"), Taio Cruz ("Positive"), and Tara McDonald ("Give Me More"). Dancing tonight reached a #1 spot on the USA Billboard dance chart.

Writing and production credits

References 

Belgian record producers
Living people
Belgian dance musicians
Year of birth missing (living people)